Anarestan Rural District is in Riz District of Jam County, Bushehr province, Iran. At the census of 2006, its population was 2,891 in 621 households; there were 616 inhabitants in 148 households at the following census of 2011; and in the most recent census of 2016, the population of the rural district was 666 in 183 households. The largest of its 11 villages was Sar Cheshmeh, with 407 people.

References 

Rural Districts of Bushehr Province
Populated places in Jam County